is a Japanese kabuki actor. His trade name is Yorozuya. His mon is the Kirichō.

Biography
Nakamura is the eldest son of Shinjiro Nakamura (currently as Nakamura Kinnosuke II). He debuted at the kabuki-za Sugawara Denju Tenarai Kagami as Kotaro in February 2002. In December 2007 Nakamura won the National Theatre of Japan Special Award for his role as Sachi in Horibe Yahee.

Filmography

Kabuki

TV series
Dramas

Variety

Advertising

Advertisements

Publications

References

External links
 
Kabuki Haiyū Meikan profile 
Yahoo! Japan profile 

1993 births
21st-century Japanese male actors
Kabuki actors
Living people
Male actors from Tokyo